The 2009–10 Oregon Ducks men's basketball team represented the University of Oregon in the 2009–10 college basketball season.  This was head coach Ernie Kent's 13th and final season at Oregon. The Ducks played their home games at McArthur Court and were members of the Pacific-10 Conference. They finished the season 16–16, 7–11 in Pac-10 play and lost in the quarterfinals of the 2010 Pacific-10 Conference men's basketball tournament. They were not invited to a post season tournament and Ernie Kent was fired at the end of the season, leading to an extensive coaching search in the subsequent offseason.

Pre-season
In the Pac-10 preseason poll, released October 29 in Los Angeles, California during the Pac-10 media days Oregon was selected to finish 6th in the conference.

Team

Roster

Coaching staff

Schedule and results

|-
!colspan=6 style=|Regular season

|-
!colspan=6 style=| Pac-10 tournament

References

Oregon Ducks
Oregon Ducks men's basketball seasons
Oregon
Oregon